Chamanabad (also Romanized as Chamanābād) is a village in Bala Khvaf Rural District, Salami District, Khaf County, Razavi Khorasan Province, Iran. At the 2006 census, its population was 1,561, in 408 families.

References 

Populated places in Khaf County